The 1981 Belgian Grand Prix was a Formula One motor race held at Zolder on 17 May 1981. It was the fifth race of the 1981 Formula One World Championship. It was the last of 12 victories for Carlos Reutemann and the last win for an Argentine driver . It was also the first of 59 podiums for 1992 World Champion Nigel Mansell.

Mechanic safety and chaotic first race
The race was marred by two serious incidents involving mechanics, one fatal. In Friday practice a mechanic from the Osella team, Giovanni Amadeo, stumbled off the pitwall into the path of the Williams of Carlos Reutemann. Reutemann was unable to avoid the mechanic, who suffered a fractured skull. He died from his injuries on the Monday after the race. Before the start of the race the mechanics of all the teams staged a protest over the safety measures protecting them, which was soon joined by several drivers (Villeneuve, Prost, Laffite, Pironi and Scheckter) who left their cars. According to  World Champion James Hunt who was commentating live for BBC in Sunday Grandstand, the protest was largely over the narrow pits at Zolder and that the pits were overcrowded, especially with people who were nothing more than 'hangers on' who were there to be seen and not for the actual racing.

The race organisers nevertheless flagged the warm-up lap at the normal time, leaving several cars delayed on the grid, either stalled or with their cockpits vacant. The resulting chaos when the grid formed up again at the end of this lap was exacerbated when Nelson Piquet missed his starting position and was sent round on another lap, with the other cars being held in position. As the cars began to overheat, several drivers turned off their engines, among them Arrows driver Riccardo Patrese, expecting another formation lap due to Piquet's error. However, the organisers began the start sequence as usual once Piquet had regained his position. Patrese was unable to restart his car and waved his arms to signal that he could not take the start. His mechanic, Dave Luckett, came onto the track to restart the car from behind. As he did so, the Clerk of the Course had already started the lighting sequence to start the race, and the race went ahead despite his presence and Patrese's gesticulations. The other Arrows driver, Siegfried Stohr, ploughed into the back of his teammate's car, hitting Luckett. Luckett suffered a broken leg and lacerations but survived the incident. The race continued, and as the field was about to start the second lap, Stohr's disabled car was still on the circuit, and some of the furious marshals, who did not have the official authority to stop the race jumped onto the track and frantically waved at the drivers to stop while the cars passed by with very little space on the narrow track. The confused drivers waved back at the marshals, and on the next lap the drivers did stop at their own accord.

As a result of these events, a new rule was introduced forbidding mechanics from being on the grid within fifteen seconds of the formation lap, and the race starter would use greater caution.

Race report
In the race, Reutemann was passed by Didier Pironi going into the first corner. Then Alan Jones nudged off Nelson Piquet at the early stages of the race and Piquet crashed into some catch fencing at the chicane. A few laps later, Jones's gearbox failed, and he ploughed into the barriers and badly burned his left thigh after the gearbox oil leaked into his cockpit. Following Jones's retirement, Piquet, still furious after their previous incident, stormed to the Williams garage and had an altercation with Jones and the Williams personnel. Pironi had fallen back and after Jones's accident, Reutemann took the lead, keeping it until the race was called off early because of rain starting to fall on the track. It was his second victory of the season and the 12th and ultimately final victory of his career.

Classification

Qualifying

† — time disallowed.

Race

Championship standings after the race

Drivers' Championship standings

Constructors' Championship standings

Note: Only the top five positions are included for both sets of standings.

References

Belgian Grand Prix
Belgian Grand Prix
Grand Prix
Circuit Zolder
May 1981 sports events in Europe